Eupoecilia crocina is a species of moth of the family Tortricidae. It is found in Afghanistan and Tajikistan.

Subspecies
Eupoecilia crocina crocina
Eupoecilia crocina hissarica Kuznetzov, 1976 (Tajikistan)

References

Moths described in 1968
Eupoecilia